Pancorius is a genus of Asian jumping spiders that was first described by Eugène Louis Simon in 1902. They are similar to Hyllus.

Description 
Pancorius, or at least its Vietnamese species, are rather big, thickset and densely haired jumping spiders. The male palpal organ has a simple structure, while the female epigyne has two pockets and their internal structures consist of 2-3 vast chambers.

Habitat 
Pancorius have been collected from various habitats including a roadside wall with dense vegetation, open forest, tropical rainforest and jungle.

Diet 
One species, P. changricus, has been reported to feed on various flies (hover flies, black flies, cluster flies), booklice and thrips.

Species
 it contains the following species, found throughout southern Asia, with one palaearctic species (P. crassipes):
Pancorius alboclypeus Kanesharatnam & Benjamin, 2021 – Sri Lanka
Pancorius altus Kanesharatnam & Benjamin, 2021 – Sri Lanka
Pancorius animosus Peckham & Peckham, 1907 – Borneo
Pancorius armatus Jastrzebski, 2011 – Nepal
Pancorius athukoralai Kanesharatnam & Benjamin, 2021 – Sri Lanka
Pancorius borneensis Simon, 1902 – Borneo
Pancorius cadus Jastrzebski, 2011 – Nepal
Pancorius candidus Wang & Wang, 2020 – China
Pancorius changricus Zabka, 1990 – Bhutan
Pancorius cheni Peng & Li, 2008 – China
Pancorius crassipes (Karsch, 1881) – Eastern and South-eastern Asia, Poland (?)
Pancorius crinitus Logunov & Jäger, 2015 – Vietnam
Pancorius curtus (Simon, 1877) – Philippines
Pancorius dabanis (Hogg, 1922) – India
Pancorius daitaricus (Prószyński, 1992) – India
Pancorius darjeelingianus Prószyński, 1992 – India
Pancorius dentichelis (Simon, 1899) (type) – Indonesia (Sumatra)
Pancorius fasciatus Peckham & Peckham, 1907 – Borneo
Pancorius goulufengensis Peng, Yin, Yan & Kim, 1998 – China
Pancorius hainanensis Song & Chai, 1991 – China
Pancorius kaskiae Zabka, 1990 – Nepal
Pancorius kohi Zhang, Song & Li, 2003 – Singapore
Pancorius latus Cao & Li, 2016 – China
Pancorius lui Gan, Mi & Wang, 2022 – China
Pancorius magniformis Zabka, 1990 – Bhutan
Pancorius magnus Zabka, 1985 – India, Nepal, Vietnam, Taiwan
Pancorius naevius Simon, 1902 – Indonesia (Java, Sumatra)
Pancorius nagaland Caleb, 2019 – India
Pancorius nahang Logunov, 2021 – Vietnam
Pancorius petoti Prószyński & Deeleman-Reinhold, 2013 – Borneo
Pancorius protervus (Simon, 1902) – Malaysia
Pancorius pseudomagnus Logunov, 2021 – Vietnam
Pancorius relucens (Simon, 1901) – China (Hong Kong)
Pancorius scoparius Simon, 1902 – Indonesia (Java)
Pancorius submontanus Prószyński, 1992 – India, Japan
Pancorius tagorei Prószyński, 1992 – India
Pancorius taiwanensis Bao & Peng, 2002 – Taiwan
Pancorius thorelli (Simon, 1899) – Indonesia (Sumatra)
Pancorius urnus Jastrzebski, 2011 – Nepal
Pancorius wangdicus Zabka, 1990 – Bhutan
Pancorius wesolowskae Wang & Wang, 2020 – China

References

Salticidae genera
Salticidae
Spiders of Asia